Thammar Boyfriend is a 2016 Indian Bengali comedy film directed by Anindya Ghosh and stars Abir Chatterjee, Sabitri Chatterjee, and Arunima Ghosh. The film released theatrically on 18 November 2016.

Synopsis 
Nandini is a wealthy and lonely aged woman who finds love in the much younger Partho, much to the chagrin of her adult son and daughter.

Cast 
 Abir Chatterjee as Partho 
 Sabitri Chatterjee as Nandini 
 Arunima Ghosh as Rini
 Dolon Roy as Ratna
 Sudipa Basu as Neeta
 Biswajit Chakraborty
 Supriyo Dutta
 Lama Halder

References 

2016 films
Bengali-language Indian films
2010s Bengali-language films